The German Imperial Naval High Command was an office of the German Empire which existed from 1 April 1889 until 14 March 1899 to command the German Imperial Navy. A similarly named office existed in the Prussian Navy and the Kriegsmarine of Nazi Germany.

After the dissolution of the German Imperial Admiralty (Kaiserliche Admiralität) on 1 April 1889, the Imperial Naval High Command, the Office of the Inspector-General of the Navy, and the Imperial Naval Office (Reichsmarineamt) were established as successor institutions. The Imperial Naval High Command was headed by a commanding admiral, directly subordinate to the emperor, Wilhelm II of Germany. With the same obligations and rights as a commanding general of the army, this admiral fulfilled the duties of a Chief of the Naval Staff. Under instructions from the emperor, he commanded all naval units at sea and ashore.

When the German Emperor decided to take over the supreme command of the Navy himself on 14 March 1899, the Imperial Naval High Command was disbanded. This happened mainly at the instigation of Admiral Alfred von Tirpitz, to increase the power of his Imperial Naval Office (Reichsmarineamt). Some of the powers of the Imperial Naval High Command were transferred to the previously existing Admiralty Staff.

Commanding Admirals

See also
Oberkommando der Marine

Sources
Walther Hubatsch: Der Admiralstab und die obersten Marinebehörden in Deutschland 1848-1945. Bernard & Graefe: Frankfurt/Main 1958
Konrad Ehrensberger: 100 Jahre Organisation der deutschen Marine, Bernard & Graefe: Bonn 1993.

External links 
http://www.deutsches-marinearchiv.de/Organisation/dienststellen/oberkommandos/okm.htm
http://www.wlb-stuttgart.de/seekrieg/km/okm.htm

Imperial German Navy
Naval history of Germany
1889 establishments in Germany
1899 disestablishments